The London Plan is a document currently written by the Mayor of London.

London Plan may also refer to:

Greater London Development Plan (1970-1973), produced by the Greater London Council
Greater London Plan (1944), developed by Patrick Abercrombie
County of London Plan (1943), prepared for the London County Council by John Henry Forshaw
London Plan (newspapers), a largely antiquated system of newspaper distribution in the United States